Marco La Villa and Mauro La Villa are identical twin brothers who are directors and producers based in New York City. 

Together, they co-directed and produced the 1998 music documentary Hang The DJ about the culture of DJs featuring Roger Sanchez, Junior Vasquez, DJ Qbert, Mix Master Mike, John "Jellybean" Benitez, Carl Cox, Kool DJ Red Alert and Claudio Coccoluto. It premiered at the 1998 Toronto International Film Festival in September 1998 and screened at multiple festivals including the International Documentary Film Festival Amsterdam.

They are known for their 2016 documentary film Black and White Stripes: The Juventus Story on Gianni Agnelli and the Italian football team Juventus F.C. "Trying to describe their subjects to the soccer-illiterate New York crowd, Marco La Villa said, "It would be like if the Kennedys owned the Yankees for 90 years."

Filmography
 2018 - Black and White Stripes: The Juventus Story
 1998 - Hang the DJ
 1995 - E Tutto Finito
 1994 - Could'a Had Class
 1994 - Sal the Barber: Framed
 1993 - Headshot
 1993 - Sleeping with the Fishes
 1992 - Palookaville

References

Bibliography
 Books

 

Other Publications

External links

 
 
 Marco and Mauro La Villa official site

Living people
1971 births
Identical twins
Sibling duos
Sibling filmmakers
Film directors from New York City
American documentary filmmakers